Kloppenburg may refer to:
JoAnne Kloppenburg, a Wisconsin assistant Attorney general
Bob Kloppenburg, an American professional basketball coach
Carlos Kloppenburg (1919–2009), a German-born Brazilian bishop of the Roman Catholic Church
Feiko Kloppenburg (born 1974), a Dutch cricketer